Listed below are the dates and results for the 1986 FIFA World Cup qualification rounds for the European zone (UEFA). For an overview of the qualification rounds, see the article 1986 FIFA World Cup qualification.

UEFA was allocated thirteen qualifying berths for the 1986 FIFA World Cup, and one place in a play-off, however Italy were the defending champions and qualified automatically, leaving 12.5 spots open for competition between 32 teams.

Europe's automatic qualifying berths were taken by Poland, West Germany, Portugal, England, Northern Ireland, France, Bulgaria, Hungary, Denmark, Soviet Union and Spain. Belgium and Scotland qualified through the UEFA Play off and UEFA / OFC Intercontinental Play-off respectively.

Format
The 32 teams were divided into 7 groups. The teams would play against each other on a home-and-away basis. The number of teams and spots for each group were as follows:

Groups 2, 3, 4 and 6 had 5 teams each. The group winners and runners-up would qualify.
Groups 1, 5 and 7 had 4 teams each. The group winners would qualify. The runners-up of Groups 1 and 5 would advance to the UEFA Play-offs, while the runner-up of Group 7 would advance to the UEFA / OFC Intercontinental Play-off. In the play-offs, the 2 teams would play against each other on a home-and-away basis, with the winner qualifying.

Group play
The draw for the qualifying groups took place in Zürich, Switzerland on 7 December 1983. During the draw teams were drawn from the 5 pots into the 7 groups. The seedings below were announced ten days before the draw.

Summary

Group 1

Group 2

Group 3

Group 4

Group 5

Group 6

Group 7

UEFA play-off

2–2 on aggregate; Belgium won on away goals.

Inter-confederation play-offs

Goalscorers

8 goals

 Preben Elkjær

6 goals

 Rainer Ernst

5 goals

 Bryan Robson
 Fernando Gomes
 Oleh Protasov

4 goals

 Michael Laudrup
 Ralf Minge
 Mark Hateley
 Michel Platini
 Wim Kieft
 Gheorghe Hagi
 Robert Prytz
 Karl-Heinz Rummenigge

3 goals

 Bedri Omuri
 Walter Schachner
 Franky Vercauteren
 Georgi Dimitrov
 Petr Janečka
 Gary Lineker
 Tony Woodcock
 Mika Lipponen
 Dominique Rocheteau
 Yannick Stopyra
 Norman Whiteside
 Dariusz Dziekanowski
 Włodzimierz Smolarek
 Carlos Manuel
 Rodion Cǎmǎtaru
 Georgi Kondratiev
 Dan Corneliusson
 Mark Hughes
 Ian Rush
 Klaus Allofs
 Pierre Littbarski
 Uwe Rahn

2 goals

 Enzo Scifo
 Plamen Getov
 Stoycho Mladenov
 Nasko Sirakov
 Klaus Berggreen
 Søren Lerby
 Andreas Thom
 John Barnes
 Jari Rantanen
 Lajos Détári
 Márton Esterházy
 József Kiprich
 Tibor Nyilasi
 Frank Stapleton
 Robby Langers
 Leonard Farrugia
 Peter Houtman
 Dick Schoenaker
 Rob de Wit
 Tom Sundby
 Zbigniew Boniek
 Diamantino Miranda
 Davie Cooper
 Mo Johnston
 Paul McStay
 Hipólito Rincón
 Thomas Sunesson
 André Egli
 Matthias Herget
 Rudi Völler
 Fadil Vokrri

1 goal

 Mirel Josa
 Agustin Kola
 Arben Minga
 Martin Gisinger
 Peter Hrstic
 Toni Polster
 Herbert Prohaska
 Gerald Willfurth
 Nico Claesen
 Georges Grün
 Erwin Vandenbergh
 Eddy Voordeckers
 Rusi Gochev
 Kostadin Kostadinov
 Boycho Velitchkov
 Paschalis Christophorou
 Kostas Foti
 Panayiotis Marangos
 Jan Berger
 Stanislav Griga
 Vladimír Hruška
 Karel Jarolím
 Vladislav Lauda
 Josef Novák
 Ladislav Vízek
 John Sivebæk
 Michael Glowatzky
 Ronald Kreer
 Matthias Liebers
 Uwe Zötzsche
 Viv Anderson
 Glenn Hoddle
 Kenny Sansom
 Chris Waddle
 Ari Hjelm
 Ari Valvee
 Philippe Anziani
 Patrick Battiston
 Luis Fernández
 Alain Giresse
 José Touré
 Nikos Anastopoulos
 Kostas Antoniou
 Tasos Mitropoulos
 Dimitris Saravakos
 Giorgos Skartados
 József Kardos
 Antal Nagy
 Antal Róth
 László Szokolai
 Magnús Bergs
 Pétur Pétursson
 Guðmundur Þorbjörnsson
 Teitur Þórðarson
 Tony Grealish
 Kevin Sheedy
 Mickey Walsh
 Carmel Busuttil
 Michael Degiorgio
 Raymond Xuereb
 Erwin Koeman
 Marco van Basten
 Gerry Armstrong
 John O'Neill
 Martin O'Neill
 Jimmy Quinn
 Pål Jacobsen
 Hallvar Thoresen
 Marek Ostrowski
 Andrzej Pałasz
 Rui Jordão
 José Rafael
 Marcel Coraş
 Ion Geolgǎu
 Gino Iorgulescu
 Ștefan Iovan
 Dorin Mateuţ
 Jim Bett
 Kenny Dalglish
 Frank McAvennie
 Charlie Nicholas
 Fyodor Cherenkov
 Anatoliy Demyanenko
 Yuri Gavrilov
 Sergey Gotsmanov
 Hennadiy Lytovchenko
 Emilio Butragueño
 Francisco José Carrasco
 Paco Clos
 Andoni Goicoechea
 Rafael Gordillo
 Marcos Alonso Peña
 Manuel Sarabia
 Ingemar Erlandsson
 Lars Larsson
 Mats Magnusson
 Torbjörn Nilsson
 Glenn Strömberg
 Umberto Barberis
 Jean-Paul Brigger
 Christian Matthey
 Metin Tekin
 İlyas Tüfekçi
 Mickey Thomas
 Thomas Berthold
 Andreas Brehme
 Karlheinz Förster
 Felix Magath
 Lothar Matthäus
 Mehmed Baždarević
 Milko Djurovski
 Ivan Gudelj
 Miloš Šestić
 Haris Škoro

1 own goal

 Nikos Pantziaras (playing against the Netherlands)
 Guy Hellers (playing against Bulgaria)
 Michel Valke (playing against Austria)
 Frederico Rosa (playing against Malta)
 Gino Iorgulescu (playing against Northern Ireland)
 Andreas Ravelli (playing against Czechoslovakia)

References

External links
 FIFA.com Reports
 RSSSF Page
 Results and scorers
 UEFA Qualifier results with full game box scores at Scoreshelf.com

 
1986 FIFA World Cup qualification
FIFA World Cup qualification (UEFA)
1984–85 in European football
1985–86 in European football